Marcos Cintra Cavalcanti de Albuquerque (born 23 August 1945) is a Brazilian economist and politician affiliated with the Brazil Union (UNIÃO).

References 

People from São Paulo
Living people
Candidates for Vice President of Brazil
Brazil Union politicians
Social Liberal Party (Brazil) politicians
Social Democratic Party (Brazil, 2011) politicians
Republicans (Brazil) politicians
Liberal Party (Brazil, 2006) politicians
Liberal Party (Brazil, 1985) politicians
Democrats (Brazil) politicians
Democratic Social Party politicians
National Renewal Alliance politicians
Harvard University alumni
1945 births